Floris is a 2004 Dutch film, directed by Jean van de Velde and starring Michiel Huisman as grandson of the original Floris from the 1969 TV series. The new side-kick is "Pi", played by popstar Birgit Schuurman. In the film some of the 1969 footage with Rutger Hauer and Bergman is included. Originally Hauer was asked to play the father of young Floris, but he declined. The film was shot in 2003.

External links
 

2004 films
2000s adventure comedy films
Dutch adventure comedy films
2000s Dutch-language films
Films directed by Jean van de Velde
Films set in the 15th century
Films based on television series
2004 comedy films